Theodora Ellen Bonwick (27 December 1876 – 10 November 1928) was a British headteacher, trade unionist, educationist and suffragette.

Life 
Bonwick was born in Shepherd's Bush in London in 1876. Her family had returned from Australia as Bonwick's three elder siblings were born there. Her parents were Sarah (born Beddow) and schoolteacher William Priessnitz Bonwick. Her mother was a suffragist and she had been active in the Women's Liberal Federation. They worked together for the Temperance movement and at a Sunday school.

Bonwick trained as a teacher at Stockwell College of Education, where she obtained a BA degree. Reports recorded her ability for teaching and she received a teacher's certificate.

In 1905 she joined the militant Women's Social and Political Union (WSPU) and became a suffragette. When Women's Sunday was organised in 1908 with women marching to Hyde Park it attracted 300,000 spectators. Bonwick was one of the speakers. 

Bowick became the secretary of the Hornsey branch of the WSPU. She tried to intercede in the dispute that had broken out in the suffragette leadership between Annie Kenney, Christabel Pankhurst and Sylvia Pankhurst. Emmeline was out of the country and Christabel was telling her younger sister that there was no room for dispute within the WSPU. Bonwick wrote a long letter to Christabel and another to Sylvia asking her to "lie low" as the public should not see more internal conflict in the WSPU. Sylvia was ejected from the WSPU for her socialist and democratic views and Borwick became the president of the Women Teachers' Franchise Union (WTFU) in 1914.

She worked at Enfield Road School for Girls in Hackney and before 1914 she was the headteacher there. She achieved a first when she obtained permission from the parents of the school to deliver sex education to her classes. No other school in London was doing this and when a 1914 enquiry considered this it was rejected – because the teachers would find it difficult.

After the war she was head of York Way Girls' School in King's Cross. She again was radical in following the Dalton Plan and she also opposed competitive sports. School inspectors noted that she was a good head but they disagreed with her views.

Death and legacy
Bonwick died in London in 1928, the year that all adults in Britain gained the right to vote. In 1990 Bonwick was chosen with three others, Agnes Dawson, Emily Phipps and Ethel Froud, to be featured in Hilda Kean's book, 'Deeds Not Words: The Lives of Suffragette Teachers'.

References 

1876 births
1928 deaths
Heads of schools in London
Suffragettes
Trade unionists from London